Jonna may refer to:

Jonna Adlerteg (born 1995), Swedish gymnast
Jonna Andersson (born 1993), Swedish football defender
Jonna Fitzgerald, American beauty pageant titleholder and musical entertainer
Jonna Doolittle Hoppes, American author whose works include oral histories and biographies
Jonna Lee (actress) (born 1963), American television and film actress
Jonna Lee (singer) (born 1981), Swedish singer, songwriter, record producer and visual director
Jonna Liljendahl (born 1970), Swedish former child actress, played Madicken (by Astrid Lindgren)
Jonna Mannion (born 1988), American reality TV personality
Jonna Mazet (born 1967), American epidemiologist, Executive Director of the University of California, Davis One Health Institute
Jonna Mendes (born 1979), former World Cup alpine ski racer from the United States
Jonna Mendez (born 1945), the former Chief of Disguise in the CIA’s Office of Technical Service
Lena Maria Jonna Olin (born 1955), Swedish actress
Jonna Pirinen (born 1982), pop and R&B singer/songwriter from Finland
Jonna Tervomaa (born 1973), Finnish pop singer and songwriter
Jonna Tilgner (born 1984), German sprinter and hurdler who specialized in the 400 metres

See also
Joanna
Joannas
Jona (disambiguation)
Jonn